The 1991 Purefoods Tender Juicy Hotdogs season was the fourth season of the franchise in the Philippine Basketball Association (PBA).

Draft picks

Occurrences
The March 17 game between Purefoods and Shell was put under protest when Hotdogs import Richard Hollis converted on a follow-up shot as time expired giving the Hotdogs a one-point win, 124-123.  The controversial match was ordered to be replayed and scheduled on April 9. 

When Purefoods defeated Pepsi Hotshots, 105-95 in Cabanatuan City on March 23, a fistfight occurred between guards Dindo Pumaren and Jun Reyes of Pepsi with only 1:30 left in the game. It was further aggravated when hotdogs rookie Joey Santamaria entered the fray. 

Following a 107-124 loss to Shell during the first round of the semifinals in the First Conference on April 18, coach Baby Dalupan has submitted his resignation, citing indifferences with the Purefoods management as his reason for quitting the team. Assistant coach Ely Capacio took over the vacant spot left by the league's winningest coach.

Import Richard Hollis left the team unnoticed prior to their must-win situation against Ginebra San Miguel during the last playing date of the semifinals in the First Conference on May 2. It was the second time in Purefoods history that an import deserted them in an all-important game. 

Pepsi Cola tendered an offer sheet amounting to P25.3 million for the services of Hotdogs' forward Alvin Patrimonio, whose contract expired on June 30. The Purefoods management matched Pepsi's tempting offer, making Alvin Patrimonio the highest paid cager in the league.

Championship
The Purefoods Tender Juicy Hotdogs won their first All-Filipino crown over corporate rival Diet Sarsi. The finals victory was the Hotdogs' second title in the last three conferences.

Awards
Alvin Patrimonio won the Most Valuable Player trophy.
Jerry Codiñera made it to the Mythical second team and he and Glenn Capacio were named to the All-defensive team.

Roster

Transactions

Trades

Additions

Subtractions
{| cellspacing="0"
| valign="top" |

Recruited imports

Win–loss record

External links
Purefoods Basketball: Purefoods Current News and Updates

References

Magnolia Hotshots seasons
Purefoods